Jessica Hammerl (born July 10, 1988 in Landshut, West Germany) is a German ice hockey defender.

International career
Hammerl was selected for the Germany women's national ice hockey team in the 2014 Winter Olympics. She did not record a point in the five games.

Hammerl also played for Germany in the qualifying event for the 2014 Winter Olympics.

As of 2014, Hammerl has also appeared for Germany at three IIHF Women's World Championships. Her first appearance came in 2011.

Career statistics

International career
Through 2013-14 season

References

External links
Eurohockey.com Profile
Sports-Reference Profile

1988 births
Living people
Ice hockey players at the 2014 Winter Olympics
Olympic ice hockey players of Germany
Sportspeople from Landshut
German women's ice hockey defencemen